Frank Wallace (Feb. 19, 1902 - Dec. 22, 1931) was an Irish-American gangster from South Boston, who ran the Gustin Gang in Boston during the Prohibition in the United States.

Wallace was the last Irishman to run the illegal rackets in Boston until, agreeing to a "sit down" with Italian mobsters Joseph Lombardi and Phillip Bruccola to resolve the recent hijacking of beer shipments by the Gustins, he and lieutenant Bernard "Dodo" Walsh were ambushed and killed as they entered their rivals' headquarters at the C.K. Importing Company located at 317 Hanover St. in Boston's North End, on December 22, 1931.

After this, the Italians were in control until the 1950s, when the Irish gangsters James "Buddy" McLean, Bernard "Bernie" McLaughlin, and the other Irish gang leaders broke away and took over the rackets. For the next 30 years, the Winter Hill Gang would be the top gang of the area.

Further reading
English, T.J. Paddy Whacked: The Untold Story of the Irish American Gangster. New York: HarperCollins, 2005.

References

1931 deaths
People from South Boston
1931 crimes in the United States
American gangsters
Prohibition-era gangsters
People murdered by the Patriarca crime family
People murdered in Massachusetts
Murdered American gangsters of Irish descent
Gangsters from Boston
1902 births